Svetlana Medvedeva (born 31 August 1992) is a Russian sport shooter.

She participated at the 2018 ISSF World Shooting Championships, winning a medal.

References

External links

Living people
1992 births
Russian female sport shooters
ISSF pistol shooters
People from Snezhinsk
European Games competitors for Russia
Shooters at the 2019 European Games
Sportspeople from Chelyabinsk Oblast
21st-century Russian women